Lake Plastiras is a municipality in the Karditsa regional unit, Thessaly, Greece. The seat of the municipality is the town Morfovouni. The municipal unit has an area of 198.350 km2. The municipality was named after the artificial Lake Plastiras, that was named in turn after the general and three-time prime ministerNikolaos Plastiras.

Municipality
The municipality Lake Plastiras was formed at the 2011 local government reform by the merger of the following 2 former municipalities, that became municipal units:
Nevropoli Agrafon
Plastiras

References

Municipalities of Thessaly
Populated places in Karditsa (regional unit)